Sunway College is a private college based in Bandar Sunway, Subang Jaya, Selangor, Malaysia. It was established on 25 July 1987 by Jeffrey Cheah. It has a 10-hectare (24 acre) campus comprising academic and residential blocks adjacent to the Sunway Lagoon theme park.

In addition to the Bandar Sunway campus, there are also colleges in Johor Bahru, Ipoh, Kuching and in Kuala Lumpur @ Velocity. The college offers a number of international sixth form, university foundation, diploma and professional courses. In some campuses, Victoria University, Australia undergraduate courses are offered as external and/or twinning courses.

History 
In 1987, Sunway College was established by its Founder, Tan Sri Dr Jeffrey Cheah, AO. A pioneer of twinning and credit transfer programmes, Sunway College offers Malaysian and international students the opportunity of obtaining well recognised foreign university qualifications from the UK, Australia and the USA here in Malaysia. Sunway College was upgraded to Sunway University College in 2004. 

In January 2011, at the time when Sunway University College became Sunway University, Sunway College was re-formed as an education provider of internationally recognised pre-university, diploma programmes, professional accounting programmes as well as undergraduate twinning degree programme with Victoria University, Australia.

Sunway College and Sunway University are part of the Sunway Education Group, fully owned and governed by the Jeffrey Cheah Foundation (JCF). The Foundation, launched in March 2010 operates via the Sunway Education Trust Fund which was set up in 1997. Sunway College channels its surpluses to provide scholarships and financial support to deserving students. To date, a total of more than RM538 million in scholarships has been disbursed by the Foundation to thousands of deserving students.

Pre-University Studies 
At the pre-university studies level, Sunway College offers grade 12 or matriculation studies options from the UK, Australia, Canada together with its own home-grown programmes. The pre-university programmes offered are:

Sunway Diploma Studies 
Sunway College offers 8 diploma programmes & 2 certificate studies designed to prepare students for careers in the various fields of study. The programmes are:

 Diploma of Accountancy
 Diploma in Finance
 Diploma in Communication
 Diploma in Interactive New Media
 Diploma in Business Administration
 Diploma in Information Technology
 Diploma in Computer Science
 Diploma in Digital Creative Content
 Certificate in Business Studies
 Certificate in Digital Creative Content

References

1987 establishments in Malaysia
Educational institutions established in 1987
Universities and colleges in Selangor
Information technology schools in Malaysia
Sunway Group